The Obuzierul Krupp, caliber 105 mm, model 1912 was a Romanian requested upgrade of the German 10.5 cm Feldhaubitze 98/09 howitzer used extensively during World War I. After two years of planning and experimentation by Romanian officers, the final design was approved and put into production by Krupp. The German aiming system was replaced with an improved Romanian system and the maximum range was increased to 6,500 meters, being superior to the 6,300 meters maximum range of its German counterpart. Maximum elevation was also increased from 40° to 60°. The first pieces started to arrive in Romania in 1912, and by the start of  World War I thirty batteries (120 pieces) were in service, their performance during the war being described as "flawless". However, wartime attrition was heavy and by the beginning of 1918, only 64 remained in service. They appear to have lingered in Romanian service into World War II. Guns captured by the Bulgarians appear to have been placed into service during World War I, although they seem to have been out of service by the outbreak of World War II.

Surviving examples

 National Military Museum, Romania, Bucharest.
 Belgrade Military Museum, Serbia

See also 
10.5 cm leFH 16 1916 successor to 10.5 cm Feldhaubitze 98/09
Artillery of World War I
List of World War II artillery

References 

105 mm artillery
World War I howitzers
World War I military equipment by country
Artillery of Romania
Romania in World War I